The 2022 6 Hours of Monza was an endurance sports car racing event held at the Autodromo Nazionale di Monza, Monza, Italy on 10 July 2022. It was the fourth round of the 2022 FIA World Endurance Championship is the final round before the summer break, and was the second running of the event as part of the championship.

Entry list 
The entry list was revealed on 20 May 2022. This race marked the début of the Peugeot 9X8, the Le Mans Hypercar built by Peugeot Sport. This was also the first race of the season without the No. 5 Team Penske LMP2 machine.

Qualifying

Qualifying results 
Pole position winners in each class are marked in bold.

Race

Race Result 
The minimum number of laps for classification (70% of overall winning car's distance) was 136 laps.

Standings after the race 

2022 Hypercar World Endurance Drivers' Championship

2022 Hypercar World Endurance Manufacturers' World Championship

2022 World Endurance GTE Drivers' Championship

2022 World Endurance GTE Manufacturers' Championship

References 

6 Hours of Monza
Auto races in Italy
Monza
6 Hours of Monza
6 Hours of Monza